Oskar Jerschke (July 17, 1861 – August 24, 1928) was a German playwright and collaborator of Arno Holz.

Jerschke was born in Lähn, the son of a military engineer and raised in the rectory of his Uncle until his father settled in Strassburg. He studied law in Strasbourg and Berlin, settling in Strasbourg as an attorney.

After the First World War, when Alsace and Strassburg came under French control, he was expelled to Berlin. There he published the tragicomedy Traumulus (The Dreamer) with his childhood friend Arno Holz in 1905. The work was a great success and a film version was made in 1936 directed by Carl Froelich and starring Emil Jannings.

Jerschke died in Berlin, aged 67.

Selected works
 Deutsche Weisen (1884) with Arno Holz
 Traumulus (1905) with Arno Holz
 Gaudeamus! A festival play for the 350th jubilee of the University of Jena (1908), with Arno Holz
 Die Perle der Antillen, Comedy (1909) with Arno Holz
 Büxl, Comedy (1911) with Arno Holz
 Mein deutsches Vaterland (1916)

External links
 
 
 
 poems at zgedichte.de (German)

1861 births
1928 deaths
German male dramatists and playwrights
19th-century German dramatists and playwrights
19th-century German male writers
20th-century German dramatists and playwrights